Otites pyrrhocephala is a species of ulidiid or picture-winged fly in the genus Otites of the family Ulidiidae.

References

pyrrhocephala